The Late Miocene (also known as Upper Miocene) is a sub-epoch of the Miocene Epoch made up of two stages. The Tortonian and Messinian stages comprise the Late Miocene sub-epoch, which lasted from 11.63 Ma (million years ago) to 5.333 Ma.

The evolution of life 
The gibbons (family Hylobatidae) and orangutans (genus Pongo) are the first groups to split from the line leading to the hominins, including humans, then gorillas (genus Gorilla), and finally, chimpanzees and bonobos (genus Pan). The splitting date between hominin and chimpanzee lineages is placed by some between 4 to 8 million years ago, that is, during the Late Miocene.

References

External links 
 GeoWhen Database - Late Miocene

.03
 03